Shinjini Bhatnagar is an Indian pediatric gastroenterologist. She is elected as Fellow of National Academy of Sciences. Her research was recognised by the World Health Organization (WHO), and at 2nd World Congress of Pediatric Gastroenterology, Hepatology & Nutrition. She was awarded the Dr. ST Achar Gold Medal Award for Research in Child Health, and Hotam Tomar Gold Medal in recognition of her research in Pediatric Gastroenterology.

Education and career
Shinjini Bhatnagar is the professor, and head of the Pediatric Biology Centre, at the Translational Health Science and Technology Institute (THSTI), Faridabad (National Capital Region, India). Projects under her leadership include exploring poor intake of oral vaccines in developing countries, extent of celiac disease  in India, etc.

Research 
How does an infant's immune system respond to a bacterial infection; what are some of the markers that can be used to track the severity, progression and outcome of infections—these are the broad questions being pursued by the Bhatnagar Lab.
Shinjini Bhatnagar and her team  came up with a quick and an economical test for gluten intolerance
Shinjini Bhatnagar and her team have proved that  zinc supplement boost infant survival from infections.

Awards and honors
 Fellow, National Academy of Sciences, India
 WHO Temporary Advisor for research in childhood diarrheal diseases 
 Recognition for research in Pediatric Gastroenterology at 2nd World Congress of Pediatric Gastroenterology, Hepatology & Nutrition (2004)

References 

Living people
Indian gastroenterologists
Indian women medical doctors
20th-century Indian women scientists
20th-century Indian medical doctors
Medical doctors from Delhi
Women scientists from Delhi
20th-century women physicians
Year of birth missing (living people)